Ruffin Golson Pleasant (June 2, 1871 – September 12, 1937) was the 36th Governor of Louisiana from 1916 to 1920, who is remembered for having mobilized his state for World War I. Prior to his governorship, Pleasant was the Louisiana attorney general from 1912 to 1916 and the city attorney of Shreveport from 1902 to 1908.

Early years and education
Pleasant was born in the community of Shiloh in Union Parish in north Louisiana to Benjamin Franklin Pleasant and the former Martha Washington Duty. An earlier governor, William Wright Heard, who served from 1900 to 1904, was also born near Shiloh. His parents' names hence evoked the spirit of patriotism that Pleasant extolled in his public life. He was educated at the former Ruston College in Ruston, the seat of Lincoln Parish, from 1885 to 1886. He then attended Mount Lebanon College, the forerunner of Baptist-affiliated Louisiana College from 1887 to 1889. In 1890 he began school at the Louisiana State University (LSU) in Baton Rouge, where he became a member of the Kappa Sigma fraternity. In 1893 he was chosen as captain of the LSU football squad and played in LSU's first match against Tulane. He graduated in 1894. Thereafter, he studied law at both Harvard College in Cambridge, Massachusetts and Yale College in New Haven, Connecticut. He was admitted to the bar in 1899.

Pleasant served in the Spanish–American War in 1898 as a lieutenant-colonel of the First Louisiana Regiment of Infantry. After the war, he launched his law practice in Shreveport, a large city by Louisiana standards which is the seat of Caddo Parish in the northwestern corner of the state. On Valentine's Day 1906, Pleasant married the former Anne Ector, the daughter of Matthew Duncan Ector and the former Sarah "Sallie" Parish Chew.

Moving up the political ladder
Pleasant was first city attorney in Shreveport, then state attorney general, and finally governor. In the 1916 general election, Pleasant, as the Democratic nominee, faced the Progressive Party's John M. Parker. Pleasant prevailed with 80,807 votes (62.5 percent) to Parker's 37.2 percent. Parker, a friend of Theodore Roosevelt's until their political split in 1916, thereafter returned to the Democratic Party and won the 1920 gubernatorial election with Pleasant's support. At the time Louisiana governors could serve only one four-year term and could not seek a second term until four years had lapsed since the end of a previous term.

As governor, Pleasant encouraged volunteers and contributions for the war effort. Louisiana's support for the war was considered to have been among the strongest in the nation. He named Lee Emmett Thomas, a banker  and a former Speaker of the Louisiana House of Representatives, as the chairman of the Louisiana Tax Commission and then the state banking examiner. Thomas thereafter served as mayor of Shreveport from 1922 to 1930. Oddly, Thomas was born in Marion, Louisiana, and educated in Union Parish at Pleasant's birthplace of Shiloh.

In 1917, Pleasant signed into law a measure by the freshman state senator, Norris C. Williamson of East Carroll Parish, which authorized state funding for the eradication of the cattle tick pest.

When Pleasant was elected governor, voters also chose Harry D. Wilson, a former state representative from Tangipahoa Parish, who began a 32-year tenure (1916-1948) as the Louisiana Commissioner of Agriculture and Forestry. Pleasant named the cotton farmer C. C. McCrory of Ascension Parish as the adjutant general of the Louisiana National Guard. Later McCrory's son, Sidney McCrory, served a term as the state agriculture commissioner.

After leaving the governorship, Pleasant resumed his law practice in Shreveport. He soon  broke with his successor, John M. Parker, over tax policy and supported Huey Pierce Long, Jr. Not long afterward, he broke with Long too and became a leading spokesman for the anti-Long faction of the Louisiana Democratic Party.

Pleasant was elected as a member of the Louisiana Constitutional Convention of 1921. That particular constitution produced by the delegates was superseded in 1974 by a newer governing document.

Pleasant was a delegate to the Democratic National Convention of 1916, which renominated Woodrow Wilson for president and Thomas Marshall of Indiana for vice president. He was also a delegate to the Democratic convention in 1924, which took 103 ballots to nominate John W. Davis of West Virginia as the party's compromise presidential nominee.

The later years

Anne Ector Pleasant died in 1934 after accidentally drinking a poisonous antiseptic in a dark bathroom in their Shreveport home. She was the founder and headmistress of Pleasant Hall, a coed private school in Shreveport. She had sued then U.S. Senator Huey Long for having caused her to be arrested on false charges and for having demeaned her as a "drunken cursing woman" when she sought to examine state public records in the Capitol in Baton Rouge.

Pleasant died in Shreveport four years later. He was Presbyterian. The couple is interred at Forest Park Cemetery off St. Vincent Avenue in Shreveport.

References

Bibliography
 "Ruffin Golson Pleasant", A Dictionary of Louisiana Biography, Vol. 2 (1988), pp. 654–655
 Miriam G. Reeves, The Governors of Louisiana (1962)
 Roy Glashan, American Governors and Gubernatorial Elections, 1775–1975 (1975)
 US GenWeb – Union Parish, Louisiana – Biography

External links
 Cemetery Memorial by La-Cemeteries
 State of Louisiana – Biography
 National Governors Association
 Time Magazine – Obits – September 24, 1934
 Political Graveyard
 Spanish American War Veterans Buried in Louisiana

1871 births
1937 deaths
American military personnel of the Spanish–American War
American Presbyterians
Harvard Law School alumni
Democratic Party governors of Louisiana
Louisiana Attorneys General
Louisiana State University alumni
19th-century players of American football
LSU Tigers football players
Politicians from Shreveport, Louisiana
People from Union Parish, Louisiana